Maltese Olympic Committee is the National Olympic Committee representing Malta. It is also the governing body responsible for Malta's representation at the Olympic Games, Commonwealth Games, European Games, Mediterranean Games, Games of the Small States of Europe and European Youth Olympic Festival.

History 
The Maltese Olympic Committee was founded on June 5, 1928 in Valletta and recognized by the International Olympic Committee in 1936.

List of presidents 
The following is a list of presidents of the Malta Olympic Committee since its creation in 1928.

Executive committee 
The current executive committee of the MOC is represented by:
 President:  Julian Pace Bonello
 Vice President: William Beck
 Secretary General: Joseph Cassar
 Finance Director: David Azzopardi
 Director of Sport: Ivan Balzan
 Directors: Lucienne Attard, Kirill Micallef Stafrace, Charlene Attard, Mario Micallef, Jonathan Vella, Paul Sultana, Maria Vella-Galea

Member federations 
The Maltese National Federations are the organisations that coordinate all aspects of their individual sports. They are responsible for training, competition and development of their sports. There are currently 28 Olympic Summer Sport Federations in Malta.

See also
Malta at the Olympics
Malta at the Commonwealth Games

References

External links
 Official website

Malta
Malta
Olympic
Malta at the Olympics
1928 establishments in Malta
Sports organizations established in 1928